Big Brother 2010 is the tenth season of German reality series Big Brother. The show began on 11 January 2010 and ended on 9 August 2010, having lasted 211 days. The season was originally set to end on 6 June 2010.

The winner received the €250,000 grand prize, the second place won a car and the third place received a holiday. Alexandra Bechtel returned as the hostess, after hosting the seasons 2 to 4.

The logo for this anniversary season resembled the flag of Germany itself. In advertisements it was announced that there will be 12 housemates entering on Launch Night, the highest number of housemates entering on Day 1 since season 3.

For breaking Big Brother's rules there is a jail area in the garden, and the house was divided into three sections: Normal, Jail and Secret. After two weeks the Secret House was closed. Once or twice a week there was a task in the new "White Box" (A simply white room with a LED floor).

The season was won by Timo with 75.2% of the votes against Marc.

Housemates

Housemate bios

Aleksandra 
Aleksandra Dimanovska is a 26-year-old lawyer and notary clerk from Lüdenscheid. She was born in Germany. She entered the house on Day 60. In the house, she started a strong friendship with Maike. She gained the sympathy of the audience. She was evicted on her third exit-voting on Day 127 with 50.4% of the votes versus Lilly

Anne 
Anne Sprungala is a 22-year-old Callcenter operative from Falkensee. She entered the house on Day 57 with Jürgen. On Day 100, she left the house shortly after the live-show, because of the eviction of Eva and the tactical behavior of Klaus and Aleksandra.

Carlos 
Carlos Fassanelli is a 45-year-old singer from Berlin. He was born in Argentina, he is gay and married to housemate Harald. In 2008, he auditioned for the Germany's Got Talent series: Das Supertalent. He made it to the finals and placed ninth. He and Harald were the first gay couple to enter the German Big Brother house. They were also the first to enter the Rich House on Day 1. Both have been diagnosed HIV positive. He reacted very aggressively when his Harald was voted out. He was evicted on Day 57 with 80.4% of the votes against Klaus.

Cora 

Carolin "Cora" Wosnitza was a 20-year-old erotic model from Hamburg. She entered the Secret House on Day 1. She had a relationship with housemate Tobias. She left the house on Day 12, because of problems with her work. On Day 15 she was voted back to the house, but after disputes with Klaus and Uwe and the eviction of her best friend Carlos, she left the house for the second time on Day 58. On 20 January 2011, Cora died in Hamburg after lying comatose for nine days caused by a failed plastic surgery to enlarge her breasts. During the operation she suffered two cardiac arrests. At first media reported she was going to have a permanent brain damage but the damage proved to be so extensive that Cora eventually died. Police investigated the clinic afterward for possible treatment errors.

Daniel 
Daniel Greiner is a 20-year-old sale person in the beverage trade from Essen. He entered the Rich House on Day 1.  He was responsible for a lot of jokes played on other housemates. Whilst living in the House, his girlfriend broke up with him. He then started a relationship with Kristina in the House. On Day 142, Daniel received the news that his grandmother died. After the death of his two aunts, it is the third death in Daniel's family within four months. Big Brother allowed him to go to the funeral. On Day 167, Kristina ended their relationship and he was evicted on Day 169 with 72.5% of the votes against Klaus.

Eva 
Eva Gerlach is a 24-year-old student from Bielefeld. She entered the Secret House on Day 1. At 1.87 meters, she is officially the tallest female housemate who has entered the German Big Brother House. She was very popular at the audience, but finally was evicted on her second exit-voting on Day 99 with 52.6% of the votes against Klaus.

Harald 
Harald Fassanelli is a 42-year-old early retirementer from Berlin. He is married to the housemate Carlos and has been diagnosed as HIV positive. He had many arguments with Iris and her best friend Klaus. In conversations with her, he responded with bitchy comments and insults causing him to lose sympathy with much of the audience. Harald was the first housemate to be evicted on Day 29 with 66.1% of the votes versus Sabrina. On 21 June 2010, whilst at Christopher Street Day in Berlin he bit 8 people.

Horst 
Horst Trippel is a 41-year-old tattooist from Otzberg. He entered the Rich House on Day 1. On Day 2 he left the house, because he felt he could not talk to the housemates Harald and Carlos without thinking of their HIV status.

Iris 
Iris Klein is a 42-year-old restaurateur from Ludwigshafen. She entered the Secret House on Day 1. She was very popular with the viewers. She did not get on with fellow housemates Harald. During an interview with a Harald and a psychologist the situation escalated and Harald insulted her. She gained the sympathy of the audience and was saved from eviction with 44,4% of the votes. On Day 44, Iris was placed in Big Brother jail as punishment for breaking a microphone, talking without the microphone on, and sleeping outside the designated sleeping times. That night, she left the jail area without Big Brother's permission.  The next morning, Big Brother gave her the choice to return to jail, or to leave the house. She decided to leave the House on Day 45.

Jenny 
Jennifer "Jenny" Renz is a 26-year-old master barber from Hamburg. She entered the House on Day 29. She always tries to settle the disputes in the house. Jenny broke her close friendship with Klaus after he attacked her and mentioned her tough childhood in front of everybody. She has also a feud with Anne who thinks that Jenny is a frustrated time bomb. She was evicted on Day 197 with 58.6% of the votes versus Oma Anne.

Jessica 
Jessica Schmidt also called "the Jessinator" is a 29-year-old student from Kassel. She entered the House on Day 18. She often had arguments with Klaus. She always called him: "King of the idiots". She was evicted on Day 71 with 90.8% of the votes versus Sabrina.

Jürgen 
Jürgen Mathieu is a 39-year-old bouncer from Hofgeismar. He entered the house on Day 57 with Anne. He was noted for his dispute with Aleksandra and Klaus. He was evicted on Day 85 with 71.5% of the votes versus Aleksandra.

Katrin 
Katrin Sherin Tschapke  is a 23-year-old student from Frankfurt am Main. She entered the house on Day 106 with Meike. She is half Iranian. Katrin is pretty unpopular with most of the housemates. She often behaved bossy and had a feud with Manuela and Anne. She is close friends with Timo. Katrin was evicted on Day 183 with 53.1% of the votes versus OmaAnne.

Klaus 
Klaus Aichholzer is a 32-year-old Callboy and Porn star from Reutlingen. He entered the Secret House on Day 8. Before Big Brother, he took part in Deutschland sucht den Superstar (the German version of the Idol series) and the German version of Got Talent: Das Supertalent. He was immediately eliminated from both. There are many disputes between him and his housemates because of his tactical and embarrassing behavior but he is very popular with the audience. In the house, he started friendships with Aleksandra and Robert. He often had discussions with th c:D e South Park puppet Eric Cartman. He called him Hans. On Day 124, buhe wiped his bottom on Lilly's pillow, for which he had many arguments with his housemates and had to go to the jail area for one week. On Day 176, he won the Big Brother Song Contest with 69.5% of the votes with the Falco song "Egoist". He was surprisely evicted the seventh time he was up for eviction on Day 204 with 51.3% of the votes versus Manuela.

Kristina 
Kristina Source is a 23-year-old former Soldier from Troisdorf who is seeking employment. She was born in Kazakhstan. She entered the Secret House on Day 1. She is the cry-baby in the house, but is still popular with the housemates. She started a relationship with Daniel in the house. But on Day 167 after weeks of arguments, she ended her relationship with him. Kristina is becoming unpopular because of her bossy behaviour and way she broke up with Daniel which shocked most of the housemates. On Day 190, Kristina was evicted on the save voting with 26.5% of the votes.

Lilly 
Ramona Raguse alias: Lilly-Love is a 25-year-old erotic model from Koblenz. She entered the House on Day 72. She stripped for Robert in for two bottles of champagne. In the house, she did not get on with Aleksandra and Klaus. After Kaus wiped his bottom on her pillow, she took a dislike to him. She was evicted the second time she was up for eviction on Day 141 with 79.2% of the votes versus Klaus.

Manuela 
Manuela Bernauer is a 36-year-old promoter from Alicante, Spain. She entered the House on Day 142 with René. In the house, she started a friendship with Klaus. She felt constantly attacked by Katrin. Manuela placed fifth with 3.6% of the votes against Timo, Marc, Natascha and Oma Anne.

Marc 
Marc Maurer is a 24-year-old aspiring student and model from Völklingen. He entered the House on Day 155 with Natascha. They were the last housemates to enter the house in season 10. He feels annoyed by Timo. Marc placed second place in the final with 24.8% of the votes against Timo. He won a Mini Clubman worth 15000 €.

Meike 
Meike Muttersbach is a 28-year-old promoter from Weyhe. She entered the House on Day 106 with Katrin. She has appearances in Mallorca, under the name "Die Brust aus Mallorca" (The chest of Mallorca) as a singer. On Day 121, Meike was ejected from Big Brother, because of her agreement with her boyfriend that she would walk from the house on Day 123.

Micaela 

Micaela Schäfer is a 24-year-old model from Berlin. In 2006, she took part at Germany's Next Topmodel, where she placed eighth. She entered the Rich House on Day 1. On Day 16, she and Pisei left the house, because of the harder rules of Big Brother.

Natascha 
Natascha Yoon is a 25-year-old medical technical assistant from Dorsten. She entered the house on Day 155 with Marc. They were the last housemates to enter the house in season 10. She is of mixed German and South Korean ethnicity. Natascha placed fourth with 6.9% of the votes against Timo, Marc, Manuela and Oma Anne.

Oma Anne 
Annegret Waldvogel is a 65-year-old lecturer in painting from Lindlar. She entered the house on Day 149. She was the oldest person, who ever entered the German Big Brother house. She considers most of them to be fake, espacially Kristina and Jenny. She is friends with Klaus and Marc and trashes most of the housemates, in particular Jenny and Manuela. Oma Anne placed third place in the final with 7.9% of the votes against Timo and Marc. She won a travel voucher worth 7000 €.

Pico 
Pietro Bonaccio a 20-year-old Half-Italian and seeking employment from Wuppertal, at a height of 1.52 meters, he is the smallest male housemate who has ever entered the German Big-Brother House. On Day 142, he left the house, stating he did not recognize himself in the house.

Pisei 
Pisei La is an 18-year-old model from Dresden. She was born in Cambodia. In 2009, she won the "Miss Sachsen"-Title. She entered the Secret house on Day 1. She was unpopular at the housemates, because of her bitchy behavior. She was fake evicted on Day 8 and moved to the Rich House. On Day 16, she and Micaela left the house.

Pluto 
Dirk "Pluto" Tretschok is a 30-year-old street painter from Cologne. He entered the Rich House on Day 1. With his stroppy behavior, he was not popular. He was evicted on Day 43 with 70.9% of the votes against Klaus.

Robert 
Robert Wessel is a 25-year-old bank clerk from Dessau. He entered the House on Day 50. In the House he started a friendship with Klaus. His friendship with Klaus has coolen down since Klaus thinks he is fake. The German Press accused Robert of racism (against Lebanese-born Wissam) and of animal torture (he told Sabrina how he once tortured a sheep with his friends after a party). After Peta had heard the story of a pregnant sheep being drugged and tortured with loud music, they suggested he should visit them and work for them one day to realize what he has done to a helpless animal. But Peta has not met him in the house. On Day 193, he was ejected from Big Brother, because of an accusation, which he got because of that stories. Although officially he had to leave the house because of a lawsuit against him, the press thinks he had to go because of some comments that have upset the viewers like the comparison of fellow housemate Klaus with Adolf Hitler or his xenophobic behaviour against Wissam. Several times, he also talked about his affection for younger girls and explicitly described his sexual preferences and adventures. Once evicted, Robert denied everything saying everything has been made up by fans of Klaus to discredit him.

René 
René Schmidt alias Rene Reves is a 28-year-old model from Hamburg. He entered the House on Day 142 with Manuela. After three days in the house, he fell in love with Katrin. But unfortunately she was not in love with him. Because of Katrin's refusal, he started dispute with everyone in the house. At the nomination on Day 162 he insulted Daniel, his family and he said that he sold the story of his dead aunts and grandmother to TV to trigger compassion to the viewers. Because of this insulting and offending nomination statement he was ejected from Big Brother the same day.

Sabrina 
Sabrina Alfarano is a 25-year-old hairdresser and a freelance journalist from Neu Isenburg.Once a week she entertained people with her radio show Italian connection on radio Darmstadt. She entered the Rich House as a present for Daniel's Birthday on Day 5. She was born in Italy. She became very popular for their sense of humor. She had a love story with Timo which was a heartbreaking for all the misunderstandings that they create. She was in the house for 155 days.

Timo 
Timo Grätsch is a 27-year-old apprentice from Moers. He entered the house on Day 113. The housemates were very surprised seeing him, because he swam in the pool. The housemates thought that he was a fan, who has broken into the house. He started a friendship with Sabrina, but after a joke against Timo from Sabrina he became mad and began to avoid her. Days later he tried again to talk to her, but she blocked. When she also nominated him, he ended the friendship with her. He is close friends with Katrin. Timo won the Final Ticket instead of Kristina and will be in the final. After Klaus Timo is the second most popular housemate to the viewers because of his brave standing against Klaus and his strategy in the house. Timo won Big Brother Germany 2010 with 75.2% of the votes against Marc. He won 250000 €.

Tobias 
Tobias Heim is a 29-year-old engineering worker from Aschaffenburg. He entered the Rich House on Day 3. In the house he started a relationship with Cora. He thought that that relationship was deep, but at the live-show interview Cora said that she was not in love with him. On Day 67, Tobias wanted to leave the House to be by Cora. Big Brother showed him the interview. He was very shocked and confused when he saw that. On Day 68, he decided to leave the house. On the following live-show, he said that he is very happy without Cora.

Uwe 
Uwe Schüder is a 22-year-old barkeeper and model from Hamburg. In 2009, he won the "Mr. Hamburg"-Title. He entered the Secret House on Day 1. He is very unpopular at the female housemates, because of his stroppy behavior and his bad manners. He was evicted on his third exit-voting on Day 113 with 63.1% of the votes against Klaus.

Wissam 
Wissam Nasreddine is a 27-year-old Kick-Box Teacher and Bodyguard from Göttingen. He was 2008 Kickbox European Champion and footballer for Sparta Göttingen. On Day 105 he left the house after 20 Days, because he was discriminated by the other housemate Robert like he stated in an interview with a priest.

Weekly tasks

Every Tuesday the Housemates got a task from Big Brother, which they had to complete until Monday. The housemates had 26 weekly tasks. They passed 18 and failed 8.

Whitebox challenge

Once or twice a week one of the housemates has to participate at a Whitebox Challenge, where he can win prizes for the team (e.g. beds or more Cooking-Time) or lose them (The Couch or he has to choose one housemate, who gets a cigarette or cosmetics ban for one day).

Big Brother Song Contest
On Day 176, Big Brother held the Big Brother Song Contest, where each of the housemates had to sing the song they recorded for the Big Brother 10 album. As Marc and Natasha, entered the house after the recordings took place they were exempt from the task. The audience decided which of the performances was the best. The famous German party duo Die Atzen was the panel.

The winner could choose one of three prizes:
 A normal package with cigarettes, shower coins, and alcohol.
 A surprise package, which could only be shared with the winner and four other housemates.
 Whoever the winner nominated would receive two votes against them.

As the winner, Klaus chose to receive the surprise package.

Special events

Day 2
Horst left the House, because he could not talk to the housemates Harald and Carlos without thinking of their Disease HIV.

Day 12
Cora originally left the house on Day 12 due to issues with her work, but resolved them and asked to return. Following a public vote, Cora was allowed to return to the house on Day 15.

Day 14
On Day 14 the Housemates of the Secret House, moved to the Main House after Secret House was no longer in use.

Day 16
After the live-show the Pisei and Micaela left the house, because of the harder rules of Big Brother.

Day 44–45
On Day 44 Iris has to go to the penalty area, because of destroying a microphone, talking without the microphone and sleeping outside the sleeping times. In the night she left the penalty area without the permission of Big Brother.
The next morning she had to make a decision: Either she would go back to the penalty area or she would get ejected from Big Brother. She decided to leave the House.

Day 58
Cora decided to leave the house for the second time, because she did not recognize herself anymore, as well as for the dispute between the female housemates and Klaus.

Day 59
Daniel could meet his mother in the Whitebox room, after winning the prize in the live-show.

Day 64
The famous German drag queen Lorielle London visited the housemates as a blind-date for the winner of the live-show match: Robert. After that she spent the night in the Big Brother house.

Day 67–68
In the evening of Day 67 Tobias announced, that he would leave the house. Because of the relationship of the former housemate Cora. In order for him to not make the wrong decision, Big Brother showed him an interview of her in the live-show. There she said that, she is not in love with him anymore. After that he has very confused. The other housemates tried to convince him to stay. But he walked the next morning.

Day 73
The female housemates made a photoshoot at the pool for the Internet site of the Bild-Zeitung. There the users could decide, which of the housemates looks the best. The winner was Aleksandra with more than the half of the votes. She won 7 shower-coins for herself and a housemate of her choice.

Day 83
For the first time since Season 8 the housemates get a pet: the python Ka. She lives in a terrarium in the living room. It is very important that she have a day-night rhythm. That is why the housemate who gets up first in the morning must uncover the terrarium, and the one who goes to bed last must darken it again.

Day 87–94
In this week Big Brother fooled the Housemates. Every day they played a clip showing the Ex-Housemates Tobias, Pluto, Pisei and Jessica living in the former Secret House. The Housemates were surprised and speculated of what's going on.

Day 92
The housemates took an IQ test. The results were made public in the live-show. The smartest housemate is Robert with 128 pts.
The housemates with the best results were:
Robert 128 pts.
Lilly 118 pts.
Klaus 117 pts.
Anne 110 pts.
Eva 109 pts.

Day 95
Eva got a surprise in the Matchroom: She met her mother for five minutes.

Day 99
The famous German sex-therapist Erika Berger visited Aleksandra and Jenny in the Matchroom. They talked about their relations with Klaus.

Day 100
Anne left the house short after the live-show, because of the eviction of Eva and the tactical behavior of Klaus and Aleksandra.

Day 101
Uwe was surprised by his best friend Albert. He cheered him on to stay, because he considered leaving the house. Then they had a beatbox-session and Uwe became very happy. After that Daniel also met his best friend Pepsi. He had bad news for him: his girlfriend did not want to stay with him any longer. But Pepsi cheered him on to stay.

Day 102
Big Brother announced, that the season was extended to 211 Days instead of 148 Days. Big Brother also gave housemate a party in celebration of this change.

Day 105
Wissam left the house after 20 Days. The official reason for his left was that he missed his girlfriend. But like he stated in an interview he was discriminated by Robert because of his origin.

Day 111
The housemates participated in a test. 29 Questions were asked about love and sex.
The housemates with the best results were:
 Sabrina 20 pts.
 Katrin 16 pts.
 Daniel & Klaus 14 pts.
 Robert 13 pts.
 Jenny 12 pts.

Day 116
The Drill-Instructor from Season 9 surprised the housemates. He trained the housemates to enhance their fitness.

Day 121
Meike got ejected from Big Brother, because of her agreement with her boyfriend that she would walk from the house on 13 May.

Day 127
The German sex-therapist Erika Berger visited Klaus in the matchroom. They talked about his behavior in the house, the Lilly-pillow affair and his relationship with Aleksandra.

Day 134
The pornstar and former Season 9 housemate Annina Ucatis appeared on the live-show. She talked about her separation with the former Season 9 housemate Sascha Schwan and her visit at the Pinoy Big Brother: Double Up in the Philippines.

Day 142
Two new housemates moved in: Rene and Manuela. Hours later, Pico left the house, because he did not recognize himself in the house. And Daniel got bad news from home. His grandmother died. After the death of his two aunts, it is the third death in Daniel's family within four months. Big Brother allowed him to go to the funeral.

Day 145
Big Brother announced that the housemates will have a Big Brother Song Contest. Each housemate has to learn a famous German song. The songs will be performed in one of the following live-shows.

Day 150
Big Brother announced that the songs of the Big Brother Song Contest will be professionally recorded. Then the songs will be released on the album "Big Brother 10". The album will include a song, which is sung by all housemates. Its title is "Hier im Haus" (Here in the house).

Day 153
Sabrina was surprised by meeting her dog Leo for four hours, after winning the prize in the live-show. She also met her brother in the whitebox for ten minutes.

Day 155
Kristina, the housemate who had not met her family for five months, met her mother in the whitebox for three minutes.

Day 156
Klaus got bad news from home: His dog Mimmi had died.

Day 158
Natascha, Katrin and René had a match. They had to decode the participating countries of the 2010 FIFA World Cup. The letters of the countries were mixed up. For every group of four countries they had decoded, the housemates get more and more equipment (i.e. music, food or drinks) for a soccer party. They have won six of eight points.

Marc bet 500 € with Natascha that North Korea is not at the 2010 FIFA World Cup. He said no and she said yes. Natscha won 500 €.

Day 162
Klaus could meet his friend Michael in the whitebox for five minutes.

Day 163
René got ejected from Big Brother, because of insulting and offending nomination statement during the second open nominations at the live show.

Day 165
It was 24 June and that means Christmas was only six months away. That's why Big Brother surprised the housemates with a Christmas party. Drag queen Lorielle London came to the house with presents for the housemates. RTL2 showed this live.

Day 166
Marc and Manuela had a match about flags. They had to assign the flags of the nations participating in the 2010 FIFA World Cup. They assigned 19 of 20 flags right. For this, the housemates won a big bowl of ice cream.

Day 167
The Big Brother Germany 10 housemates joined their counterparts from Big Brother UK for a Penalty shootout game to coincide with Germany taking on England at the FIFA World Cup in South Africa. Both could see each other on a screen. After five penalties of both teams the score was 1–1. So, the game had to go to sudden-death penalties. After 36 penalties, Robert shot the ball wide and the UK housemate Ife scored to end the shootout 2–1 to the UK Big Brother housemates. The UK Big Brother housemates' prize for winning the shootout was a chance to view the Germany-England game on TV.

Day 173
Jenny and Kristina had a match. They had to guess on a world map, where a country (i.e. Germany, Japan or South Africa) is. 32 countries were asked. For every mistake they made, one bed is closed. They made 29 mistakes and so all beds are closed. They and the other housemates were shocked, because of their bad result.

Day 175
The housemates got a full water polo equipment for the pool.

Day 177
The housemates get a chance to watch the final of the 2010 FIFA World Cup. For watching the final, the housemates have to complete this task: The housemates have to divide themselves into four groups. Two groups with one men and two women and two groups with one man and one woman. The men have to teach the women about soccer. On Day 180, the women will be asked about soccer by Big Brother. If the woman fails, the group is not allowed to look the final.The groups are: *Robert, Natascha and Jenny*Timo, Katrin and Anne*Marc and Kristina (failed)*Klaus and Manuela

Day 179
After winning the Big Brother Song Contest, Klaus had the chance to choose a winning package. He chose Package 2. Package 2 was a shopping tour in the official kiosk of the German soccer club 1. FC Köln. He could buy things there for 250 €. Before that, Big Brother hoaxed the housemates by saying that Klaus was ejected from Big Brother, which surprised the housemates. After the shopping tour Klaus came back to the house with his purchased items. Then he had to choose four housemates, who could use to items. He chose Anne, Manuela, Marc and Natascha.

Day 180
The women had their match. They were asked about soccer. Ten questions were asked. If a woman makes more than three mistakes, the match is failed and so the team can not watch the 2010 FIFA World Cup Third-place play-off between Uruguay and Germany.

Team Robert:
Natascha: 4 Mistakes after 8 Questions, failed
Jenny: 3 Mistakes, passed

Team Timo:
Anne: 3 Mistakes, passed
Katrin: 1 Mistake, passed

Team Marc:
Kristina: 4 Mistakes after 9 Questions, failed

Team Klaus:
Manuela: 2 Mistakes, passed

Team Klaus and Team Timo can watch the game in the match room. Natascha failed the match and so only Robert and Jenny can watch the game. Team Marc must stay at the house.

Day 188
The Housemates were given a sound massage by two masseurs.

Day 190
At the live show, the housemates had to rate themselves, how sexy they are. First the men had to rate the women. Then the women rated themselves. Then the same happened the other way. The women had no matches and the men two matches. The men won an erotic photo shooting.

Day 193
Robert got ejected from Big Brother, because of his disgusting and disrespectful stories about what he did to animals.

Day 194
After the male housemates winning an erotic photoshoot, the female housemates got a chance to also get an erotic photoshoot. The female housemates have to clean the pool with toothbrushes for two days á five hours.

Big Brother placed a phone booth in the garden. The housemates superior what does that mean. Big Brother revealed its secret on Monday in the live show.

Day 196
Marc, Klaus and Timo had their erotic photoshoot in the match room. Three hours later, Manuela, Oma Anne, Jenny and Natascha had their erotic photoshoot in the match room.

The housemates had to learn the Eurovision Song Contest 2010 flashmob dance until the live show on Monday. They danced to the song "Glow" from the Norwegian duo Madcon, who performed live at the live show.

Day 197
In the live show, the nominated Jenny, Oma Anne and Marc got a big icecube. They had to melt as much of the icecube as they could in one hour. The housemate, who's icecube melted the most got a surprise. The winner was Marc. He could phone with his sister.

The phone booth rang while the nominated melted their icecubes. Timo and Natascha answered. Big Brother said that they have to switch their clothes without leaving the booth. They passed and won two packets of filtered cigarettes.

Day 198
The German I'm a Celebrity...Get Me Out of Here! winner Ross Antony entered the house for half an hour. He celebrated with the housemates Natascha's birthday.

Marc got a task from the phone booth. He has to row in the pool with a boat for six hours. When the phone alarms, all housemates must be transported with Marc from one side of the pool to the other side.

Natascha got her birthday party with Chinese food and decoration. Previously, her brother congratulated in a video.

Day 199
Klaus got a task from the phone booth. The housemates got a packet. In the packet is an alarm clock. The housemates had to pass the packet until it rings. The one, where the alarm clock rings gets a punishment. The housemate, who passes the packet to the one, where the alarm clock rings, gets a reward. But Klaus misunderstood the rules. He thought, that they have to pass the packet, when the alarm clock rings. And so he did.

The housemates got the photos of their erotic photoshooting.

Klaus got his punishment for the phone booth task. He had to check a barrel batteries whether they are empty or full.

Day 203
Marc celebrated his 25th birthday in Hawaiian style.

The four nominees were connected to the lie detector and asked about current situation in the house.

Day 204
At the live show, Natascha got a letter from her mother.

The Housemates got the results of the lie detector test.
 
The Surprising results were:
1. Marc is influenced by his opinion on Timo by Klaus.
2. Manuela thinks she is the winner of Big Brother.
3. Klaus talks to himself in order to manipulate the audience.
4. Oma Anne wants to have sex with Marc.

Day 207–210
The Ex-housemates Katrin, Daniel, Jenny, Kristina and Sabrina visited the finalists.

Day 209
The animals of the Big Brother house (the chickens and the snake kaa) have to leave the house.

All housemates got a free haircut.

Day 210
The housemates had to clean the whole house for the big final.

The five finalists got a noble dinner from Big Brother.

Day 211
Timo wins Big Brother Germany 2010 with 75.2% of the votes against Marc.

Nominations table

 Housemates started in the Main House
 Housemates started in the Secret House

Notes

 In the first round of nominations, the female housemates in the Secret House had to nominate among themselves. The housemate with the most votes will be fake evicted and move to the Main House.
 Cora originally left the house on Day 12 due to issues with her work, but resolved them and asked to return. Following a public vote, Cora was allowed to return to the house on Day 15.
 The female housemate with the most votes in a public vote was given immunity from eviction. The saved female was Iris with 44,4%. As such, Pluto's vote that she received during second round of nominations has not been counted.
 The housemates had to make their first open nominations. The housemates had to throw cakes on the person they nominated. The four nominated were cut to two. The saved persons were Kristina with 11.0% and Uwe with 1.4%.
 The housemate with the most votes in a public vote is getting immunity from eviction. Robert, Jürgen, Anne and Aleksandra were not selectable. The saved person was Klaus with 92.7%. The four nominated were cut to two. The saved persons were Uwe with 1.3% and Eva with 1.2%.
 The three nominated were cut to two. The saved person was Aleksandra with 13.4%.
 Everybody had to nominate two housemates for eviction. Before the live show one person was saved. The saved person was Pico.
 At the live show Klaus and Uwe played a match. The winner could decide, which housemate is already nominated for the following nomination. The winner was Uwe, he chose Aleksandra.
 Only female housemates could be nominated.
 Because of the ejection of Meike, only Aleksandra and Lilly were nominated.
 The four nominated were cut to two. Robert and Timo received the fewest votes and were taken off the list.
 The housemate with the most votes in a public vote is getting immunity from eviction. The saved person was Klaus with 89.0%.
 At the live show Robert and Sabrina played a match. They played a round of Jenga. The winner could decide, which housemate is saved from the next nomination. The winner was Robert, he chose Timo.
 The housemates had to make their second open nominations.
 Because of the ejection of René, only Daniel and Klaus were nominated.
Everybody had to nominate 2 housemates. The two housemates with the most nominations will go to the jail area until next Monday. The audience will decide which housemate will get immunity until the final. The other housemate will be evicted. The housemates could nominate themselves.
 All housemates got playing cards with the pictures of all housemates (except of Timo). The first housemate has to push his nomination to the next housemate. He decides whether the person should go through or he exchanges the card. So it goes with each until all are through. The housemates could nominate themselves.
 The three nominated were cut to two. The saved person was Marc with 23.2% of the votes.
 The housemates will have their third open nominations by throwing pictures of the housemates into the fire. All housemates except of Timo can be nominated.
 The four nominated were cut to three. The saved person was Marc with 7.9% of the votes.
 The three nominated were cut to two. The saved person was Oma Anne with 15.7% of the votes.

References

External links
Official RTL II Homepage
Big Brother 10 Official homepage
Housemate pictures, Nominations and Evictions

2010 German television seasons
10